BB17 may refer to:

USS Rhode Island (BB-17)
Big Brother 17 (disambiguation), a television programme in various versions